Mettlach (Saarlandic dialect:Mettlich) is a municipality in the district Merzig-Wadern, in Saarland, Germany, situated on the river Saar, approximately  northwest of Merzig, and  south of Trier. The headquarters of Villeroy & Boch are in Mettlach. Also, the Mettlach tiles are named after the municipality.

Municipalities 

The population of the present city, including all outlying districts (as of 31 December 2015):

Sights 
 Castle Montclair within the Saarschleife
 Castle Saareck
 Castle Ziegelberg
 Chapel of St. Joseph
 Cloef-Atrium (conference and visitor center) in Orscholz
 Cultural-historical exhibition in the adventure center of Villeroy & Boch
 Old abbey
 Old tower
 Parish Church of St. Gangolf
 Parish Church of St. Hubertus, with Gothic Revival organ
 Parish Church of St. Lutwinus, with alabaster choir star unique in Germany
 Saarschleife at the Cloef
 Stoneware museum

References

Merzig-Wadern
Districts of the Rhine Province